Sergey Mikhailovich Nikolsky (30 April 1905 – 9 November 2012) was a Russian mathematician. He was born in Talitsa, which was at that time located in Kamyshlovsky Uyezd, Perm Governorate, Russian Empire. He had been an Academician since November 28, 1972. He also had won many scientific awards. At the age of 92 he was still actively giving lectures in Moscow Institute of Physics and Technology. In 2005, he was only giving talks at scientific conferences, but was still working in MIPT, at the age of 100. He died in Moscow in November 2012 at the age of 107.

Scientific activities
Nikolsky made fundamental contributions to functional analysis, approximation of functions, quadrature formulas, enclosed functional spaces and their applications to variational solutions of partial differential equations. He created a large scientific school of functions' theory and its applications. He authored over 100 scientific publications, including 3 monographs, 2 college textbooks and 7 school textbooks.

Selected publications
 Approximation of functions of several variables and imbedding theorems, Springer Verlag 1975 (Russian original, Nauka, Moscow 1969)
 Treatise on the shift operator, Springer Verlag 1986 (Russian original, Moscow 1980)
 Operators, functions and systems. An easy reading. Volume 1: Hardy, Hankel and Toeplitz, American Mathematical Society 2002
mit Valentin Petrovich Ilyin and Oleg Besov: Integral representation of functions and embedding theorems, 2 vols., Wiley 1978, 1979
as editor: Theory and applications of differentiable functions of several variables, American Mathematical Society 1967
Quadrature formulae, Delhi, Hindustan Publ. Corp. 1964
Курс математического анализа (Course in mathematical analysis, Russian), 2 vols., Nauka 1975
with : Differential equations, multiple integrals, series, theory of functions of a complex variable, Mir Publ., Moscow 1983

References

External links 
 List of publications, downloadable here: Russian Academy of Sciences
 For Nikolsky's centenary
 

1905 births
2012 deaths
People from Sverdlovsk Oblast
People from Kamyshlovsky Uyezd
Russian mathematicians
Soviet mathematicians
Russian centenarians
Men centenarians
Full Members of the USSR Academy of Sciences
Full Members of the Russian Academy of Sciences
Oles Honchar Dnipro National University alumni
Academic staff of the Moscow Institute of Physics and Technology
Academic staff of Oles Honchar Dnipro National University
Stalin Prize winners
Recipients of the USSR State Prize
Burials in Troyekurovskoye Cemetery
Laureates of the State Prize of Ukraine in Science and Technology